Charles Douglas Tomalin,  (20 August 1914 – 19 December 1998) was an English diver who competed for Great Britain in the 1936 Summer Olympics.

In 1936 he finished ninth in the 10 metre platform event. At the 1934 Empire Games he won the silver medal in the 3 metre springboard event and in the high diving competition. Four years later at the Sydney Games he won the gold medal in the high diving contest and the silver medal in the 3 metre springboard event. Subsequently, he became a senior and decorated officer in the Royal Air Force, rising to the rank of air commodore.

References

External links
 
 

1914 births
1998 deaths
English male divers
Olympic divers of Great Britain
Divers at the 1936 Summer Olympics
Divers at the 1930 British Empire Games
Divers at the 1934 British Empire Games
Divers at the 1938 British Empire Games
Commonwealth Games gold medallists for England
Commonwealth Games silver medallists for England
Commonwealth Games medallists in diving
Commanders of the Order of the British Empire
Recipients of the Air Force Cross (United Kingdom)
Recipients of the Distinguished Flying Cross (United Kingdom)
Medallists at the 1934 British Empire Games
Medallists at the 1938 British Empire Games